Frigiliana is a town and municipality in the province of Málaga, part of the autonomous community of Andalusia in southern Spain. The municipality is situated approximately 71 kilometers east of Málaga, the provincial capital, and approximately 6 kilometers north of Nerja. It is located in the comarca of La Axarquía, the easternmost region of the province, and integrated into the judicial district of Torrox.

Moorish-Mudéjar district
This is the old district inhabited by the Moors before and after the Reconquista. Its name Mudéjar is used to describe the architectural style used by Muslim craftsmen working in Christian territory. The quarter is made up of steep cobbled alleyways winding past white houses resplendent with flowers.

Culture
For four days at the end of August each year, Frigiliana hosts the Festival of the Three Cultures (Festival de las Tres Culturas), celebrating the region's historic confluence and co-existence of Christian, Muslim and Jewish traditions.

Frigiliana has been recognised as "Spain's most beautiful and well-preserved village" on several occasions, and is known as the "white village".

Frigiliana is referenced in the Irish song, 'Lisdoonvarna' by Christy Moore:
"Summer comes around each year,
We go there and they come here.
Some jet off to … Frigiliana,
But I always go to Lisdoonvarna."

Tourism
Frigiliana is just west of the vast Sierras of Tejeda, Almijara and Alhama Natural Park, which is home to several hiking trails. The village also holds a vast array of events, the most popular of which being the "Festival de las tres culturas", or the three cultures festival, which takes place on the last weekend of each August. The festival includes countless live performances on the main stage along with street performers all around the streets of the village. Also a popular part of the festival is "la ruta de la tapa" or tapas route, the completion of which earns the entrant a free t-shirt.

References

External links

 Official website
 Signposted trail Frigiliana - Fuente del Esparto

Municipalities in the Province of Málaga
Towns in Spain